"Sweet" Dick Whittington (born 1934) is a long-time Los Angeles disc jockey who has also appeared as an actor in movies and on television.

Career
Prior to his arrival in Southern California, Whittington was a popular radio personality in the San Francisco Bay area at Oakland's KROW (960 AM), where he hosted the Night Watchman overnight program, and, later, a weekday afternoon show, from 1955 to 1958. In the fall of 1958, he moved to KSFO (560 AM) in San Francisco, as host of the 9 p.m. to midnight program.  He began his stint in Los Angeles at KABC 790 AM, doing a one-hour talk show weekdays and a 3-hour Sunday talk show from 1965 to 1969.

His greatest fame in the Los Angeles market came after he moved in 1969 to the morning drive time slot at KGIL AM 1260 in the "Sin Fernando Valley". For a brief time, he left KGIL to do the evening drive time slot at KFI AM 640. He was briefly heard in the late 1980s on KIEV (870 AM) and, for a few months in 1989, was back at KABC AM.

Many people regard his broadcast style as being ahead of its time. Rather than the "happy morning to you" type of radio personality, he often spoke on the air about things that bothered him and foreshadowed the Howard Stern era of speaking your mind. At stations where he was still spinning records, he would many times interrupt a song midway through saying, "I like it up to that point, then I get bored."

He was an ensemble member of the top-rated TV series Rowan & Martin's Laugh-In (1968-69 season). One of Whittington's notable film roles was as the disc jockey in the TV movie Duel, Steven Spielberg's directorial debut.  He can also be seen briefly as a ring announcer in Martin Scorsese's Raging Bull.

Radio credits

KROW (Oakland), 1955–1958
KSFO (San Francisco), 1958–1959
KNOB, 1960–62
KLAC, 1960–63
KGIL, 1965–75 and 1978–85
KABC, 1966–68
KFI, 1975–77
KIEV (870 AM), 1982 and 1988
KHJ, 1983
KABC, 1989–90
KMPC 1990-91
KNJO, 1994–95
KKJL, 1999-?

Television and film credits
Rowan & Martin's Laugh-In
The Incredible Hulk (1978 TV series)
Raging Bull
The Jeffersons
Fantasy Island
The Nine Lives of Fritz the Cat
Almost Anything Goes
Duel
The Waltons
Nanny and the Professor

References

External links
 
 Dick Whittington at LARadio
 Dick Whittington unofficial fansite
 Dick Whittington at Pacific Pioneer Broadcasters

1934 births
American radio DJs
Living people